After Midnight: Kean College, 2/28/80 is a live album by the Jerry Garcia Band. It was recorded in Union Township, Union County, New Jersey, at Kean College on February 28, 1980, and released in 2004.

Some copies of After Midnight included a bonus disc, Way After Midnight, with tracks recorded on February 29 at Calderone Concert Hall in Hempstead, New York and on March 1 at the Capitol Theatre in Passaic, New Jersey. The recording is widely considered to be one of the best from the early 1980s that the Jerry Garcia Band played.

Track listing

Charts 
 #118 on the Billboard 200

CD Cover drawing credit: Dayna Winston

Credits

Jerry Garcia Band 
 Jerry Garcia — guitar, vocals
 John Kahn — bass
 Ozzie Ahlers — keyboards
 Johnny d'Fonseca Jr — drums

Additional personnel 
 Robert Hunter — guitar, harmonica, vocals

Production 
 Original producer — Jerry Garcia
 Release producer — Christopher Sabec, Peter McQuaid, Hale Milgrim
 A&R supervision — James Austin, Jimmy Edwards
 Tape research — David Lemieux
 Mixing — Tom Flye
 Second engineer — Robert Gatley
 Mastering — Joe Gastwirt
 Editorial supervision — Steven Chean
 CD booklet notes — Robert Hunter
 Art direction, design — Hugh Brown, Katherine Delaney
 Live photos — Jay Blakesberg
 Album coordination — Jeff Adams

References 

Jerry Garcia Band live albums
2004 live albums
Rhino Records live albums